Brett Perriman (born October 10, 1965) is a former American football wide receiver in the NFL for the New Orleans Saints (1988–1990), the Detroit Lions (1991–1996), the Kansas City Chiefs (1997), and the Miami Dolphins (1997). He played college football at the University of Miami.

Collegiate career
Perriman was a wide receiver at the University of Miami under coach Jimmy Johnson. Perriman finished his 4-year career there with 62 catches for 1,073 yards and 6 TD. He also had 550 punt return yards with 1 TD and a 22-yard kick return in 1985. His best season was 1986 when he finished with 34 catches, 647 yards receiving, and 4 TD. All second to teammate Michael Irvin on the year.

NFL career

Perriman is perhaps best known for his time spent in Detroit, as part of a Lions' passing attack that complemented the team's featured running back, Hall of Famer Barry Sanders. In 1995, Perriman had a career-high 108 receptions for 1,488 yards (fourth highest single-season total in team history).  His teammate that year, Herman Moore, had 123 receptions and 1,686 yards (both franchise records, and the 123 receptions were a league record that stood until 2002, when Marvin Harrison broke his record), and Moore/Perriman became the first duo in NFL history with more than 100 receptions in the same season. They were also the first duo to post 1,400 yards each in the same season.  Brett Perriman was a key contributor on Detroit teams that made the playoffs in 1991, 1993, 1994, and 1995. The 1991 and 1993 teams won the NFC Central Division title. The 1991 team posted a franchise record 12 victories and appeared in the NFC Championship game. Perriman currently ranks fourth on Detroit's all-time list with 428 receptions for 5,244 yards. He finished his career with 525 receptions, 6,589 yards, and 30 touchdowns.  He also had 180 rushing yards.  On Nov. 6, 1994, Perriman became the first player to score 2 two-point conversions in one game, both coming in the 4th quarter.

Perriman was interviewed about his time at the University of Miami for the ESPN 30 for 30 documentary The U, which premiered December 12, 2009 on ESPN.

Personal life
Perriman has a son, Breshad, who has been in the NFL for eight seasons.

References

1965 births
Living people
Miami Northwestern Senior High School alumni
American football wide receivers
Miami Hurricanes football players
New Orleans Saints players
Detroit Lions players
Kansas City Chiefs players
Miami Dolphins players
Players of American football from Miami